Epler Glacier is a tributary glacier,  long, draining west from Nilsen Plateau in the Queen Maud Mountains to enter Amundsen Glacier just south of the Olsen Crags. It was mapped by the United States Geological Survey from surveys and U.S. Navy air photos, 1960–64, and was named by the Advisory Committee on Antarctic Names for Charles F. Epler, a storekeeper with U.S. Navy Squadron VX-6 on Operation Deep Freeze 1966 and 1967.

See also
 List of glaciers in the Antarctic
 Glaciology

References 

Glaciers of Amundsen Coast